Woodlands is a neighborhood located within the Mitchells Plain urban area of the City of Cape Town in the Western Cape province of South Africa. It is located in the central western part of Mitchells Plain.

References

Suburbs of Cape Town